Minnesota State Highway 139 (MN 139) is a  highway in southeast Minnesota, which runs from Iowa Highway 139 at the Iowa state line and continues north to its northern terminus at its intersection with U.S. Highway 52 in Harmony.

Highway 139 passes through the city of Harmony and Harmony Township.

Route description
Highway 139 serves as a north–south route between the Iowa state line and the city of Harmony. It is also known as Main Avenue in Harmony.

The route passes near Niagara Cave.

The route is legally defined as Route 79 in the Minnesota Statutes. It is not marked with this number.

History
Highway 139 was authorized in 1933.

The route was paved by 1953.

Highway 139 was numbered to match adjoining Iowa Highway 139.  This is the only example where Minnesota numbered a route to match an existing route in Iowa, rather than the opposite.  Iowa renumbered its state highways that crossed into Minnesota in the early 1960s to match the Minnesota numbers.

Major intersections

References

139
Transportation in Fillmore County, Minnesota